Gilles Dambrine from the IEMN - Institute of Electronic, Microelectronic and Nanotechnology, Lille, France was named Fellow of the Institute of Electrical and Electronics Engineers (IEEE) in 2016 for contributions to the modeling of small signal and noise characteristics in nanoscale high-frequency devices.

References 

Fellow Members of the IEEE
Living people
Year of birth missing (living people)